Dasht-e Khak (also Romanized as Dasht-e Khāk, Dasht-i-Khāk, and Dasht Khāk) is a village in Dasht-e Khak Rural District, in the Central District of Zarand County, Kerman Province, Iran. At the 2006 census, its population was 3,328, in 835 families.

References 

Populated places in Zarand County